Julia Carolina Suárez Miranda (born 1 November 1996) is an American-born Peruvian footballer who plays as a forward for the Peru women's national team.

Her mother is Peruvian and her father is Venezuelan.

References

External links

1996 births
Living people
Citizens of Peru through descent
Peruvian women's footballers
Women's association football forwards
Peru women's international footballers
Peruvian people of Venezuelan descent
People from Woodbridge, Virginia
Soccer players from Virginia
American women's soccer players
VCU Rams women's soccer players
American sportspeople of Peruvian descent
American sportspeople of Venezuelan descent